Dr. Muḥammad Saʻīd Raslān (born November 23, 1955) is an Egyptian Salafi scholar, teacher and author based in Sobk el Ahad, Egypt. He is salafi in Aqīdah and Fiqh. He is known for having courage and defending the manhaj of the Salaf, and the manhaj of Salafis.

He was born in the village of Sobk el Ahad, Ashmun, Munofiaa (Egypt) which is about 45 minutes from Cairo.

Sheikh Muhammad Saeed Raslan traveled to Jordan in 2012
In the presence of Sheikh Qira 2012
And the reciter, Dr. Ibrahim Al-Jarmi
and Dr. Ismail Abu Ela
And Dr. Ismail Rabeim 

Raslan is known for his strong anti-Muslim Brotherhood stance. He is also opposed to democracy and political parties and for opposing revolutions and rebelling against Democratic Governments and Secular Rulers. The number of those who attend his mosque has quadrupled to over 4000 since the overthrow of Hosni Mubarak and has gained thousands of students from countries all over the world, such as the US, Japan, France, Spain, England, Kazakhstan, Russia, among other countries.

He follows the manhaj of the salaf and has authored more than 49 books.

Education
He received a bachelor's degree in medicine, a bachelor's degree in surgery from Al-Azhar University and a Bachelor of Arts from the Department of the Arabic Language, the Islamic Studies Division.

References

External links
Shaykh Raslan's website (Arabic)

Living people
Egyptian Salafis
1955 births
Al-Azhar University alumni